Megachile tecta is a species of bee in the family Megachilidae. It was described by Radoszkowski in 1888.

References

Tecta
Insects described in 1888